Joel James (09/03/1985) is a Welsh Conservative politician who has served as a Member of the Senedd (MS) for the region of South Wales Central since the 2021 Senedd election.

Background 
Joel was born at East Glamorgan General Hospital in Church Village and attended Bryn Celynnog Comprehensive School in Beddau.

Following his time at Bryn Celynnog, Joel studied History at the University of Bristol and completed a postgraduate degree in Welsh History at Cardiff University.

Prior to being elected as a Member of the Senedd in 2021, Joel worked as a librarian at Cardiff Sixth Form College - one of the highest rated schools in the UK.

Political career 
Joel became the first ever Conservative elected to Rhondda Cynon Taf Country Borough Council in 2008.

Though he stood down in 2022, Joel still represents the ward of Efail Isaf on Llantwit Fardre Community Council.

Joel was elected to the Welsh Parliament on the 8th of May 2021 on the regional voting list alongside leader of the Welsh Conservative Group in the Senedd, Andrew RT Davies. Both Joel and Andrew were selected as candidates to represent the South Wales Central region.

On the 27th of May 2021, Joel was appointed to the Welsh Conservative Shadow Cabinet as Shadow Minister for Social Partnership  a portfolio that covers many issues such as; public services (including community fire safety), the Wales and Africa programme, Coal tip policy and the promotion of sustainable development.

As Member of the Senedd, Joel also sits on two different committees; The petitions committee and the Local Government and Housing Committee. As well as participating in these committees, Joel is also involved in a number of different Cross-Party Groups, and is the Chair of the Liver Disease and Liver Cancer Cross-Party Group in the Senedd.

Prior to his election to the Senedd, Joel stood for election for the Pontypridd constituency in 2011, 2016 and 2021, a seat long held by Welsh Labour.

External links 

 Official website 
 Joel James MS on the Senedd website

References

Living people
Conservative Party members of the Senedd
Wales MSs 2021–2026
1985 births